En Busca de un Ídolo 2015 ("In Search of an Idol 2015")  was a professional wrestling tournament held by the Mexican Lucha Libre (professional wrestling) promotion Consejo Mundial de Lucha Libre (CMLL) from May through August, 2015. The qualifier took place on May 24, 2015 to determine which eight wrestlers would compete in the main portion of the show. This is the fourth time since 2012 that CMLL has held an En Busca de un Ídolo tournament, making it the fourth overall tournament under that name. All tournament matches took place in CMLL's main building, Arena México on Tuesday and Friday shows. Like the first 2012 and 2014 version of the tournament was devised to focus on a group of younger wrestlers trying to prove themselves to both CMLL and the fans. The first round of the tournament ran from June 5 to July 21 with Guerrero Maya Jr., Boby Zavala, Esfinge and Disturbio all qualifying for the second round. The second round ran from July 31 to August 14 and the finals of the tournament took place on August 21 with Zavala winning the tournament.

Tournament Prize
The winner of the tournament will be given the opportunity to work on the 2016 Fantastica Mania show, an event co-promoted by CMLL and New Japan Pro-Wrestling (NJPW) that takes place in Japan once a year. Additional rewards have not yet been announced, previous years winners have also received championship matches, but that has not been verified for the 2015 tournament.

Tournament format
The tournament will be split into three rounds, in the first round all eight wrestlers will face off in a Round-robin tournament, each wrestling seven matches split between CMLL Tuesday and Friday shows in Arena Mexico. Wrestlers will earn points based on their in ring result, judging and an online poll. The top four point earners will move on to round two. Round two is another round-robin tournament between the top four point earners. At the end of the round the top two wrestlers will face off in the finals of the tournament. All matches except the finals will be one fall with a 10-minute time limit, the finals will be a

Point system
Wrestlers can earn points in one of three ways
Match results
20 Points for a victory
10 Points for a draw
0 points for a loss

Judging
The tournament includes four judges, referee El Tirantes, wrestler Shocker, trainer Hijo del Gladiador and a fourth judge that would rotate from show to show. The judges can award up to 10 points each based on skills displayed, the way a wrestler portray their character, their personality, their charisma, and how much of a fan response they get during their matches.

Online Poll
The third way to earn points for the tournament is through an online poll conducted after each match on the En Busca de un Ídolo website. The online poll could give a wrestler a maximum of 40 additional points in the tournament each week.

Participants

Team Negro Casas
Blue Panther Jr.
Canelo Casas
Delta
Guerrero Maya Jr.

Team Virus
Boby Zavala
Disturbio
Esfinge
Flyer

Judges
Shocker
Hijo del Gladiador
El Tirantes
4th Judge changes from week to week

Tournament qualifier

On May 24, 2015 16 wrestlers competed in a torneo cibernetico elimination match, competing for eight spots in the main portion of the En Busca de un Ídolo tournament. The 16 wrestlers were Akuma, Blue Panther Jr., Cancerbero, Canelo Casas, Delta, Disturbio, Esfinge, Flyer, El Gallo, Guerrero Maya Jr., Joker, Pegasso, Raziel, Sagrado, Stigma and Boby Zavala. In the end Blue Panther Jr., Boby Zavala, Canelo Casas, Delta, Disturbio, Esfinge and Flyer, Guerrero Maya Jr. qualified for the main portion of the tournament.

Round one
During the May 27, 2015 CMLL Informa show it was revealed that Negro Casas would be the trainer for Blue Panther Jr, Canelo Casas, Delta and Guerrero Maya Jr. while Virus would be the trainer for Zavala, Disturbio, Esfinge and Flyer. Three out of the four wrestlers on Virus' team were already in his wrestling class, adding Disturbio to the group. During the CMLL Informa episode the announcers pushed the storyline that Casas might have a harder time with his team, training the son of long time rival Blue Panther, Casas' nephew and the two most experienced wrestlers in the group who may not be as open to his input as a trainer. During the first round Guerrero Maya Jr. earned 100 points from winning five matches in total during the seven-week round-robin tournament, the most of any of the participants while Flyer only earned 30 points for one victory (over Blue Panther Jr.) and a draw against Canelo Casas, the least of any participant. Guerrero Maya Jr. was also the person to get the highest accumulated score from the judges, a total of 221 points, with Delta receiving the lowest collective score a total of 132 points. The online poll had Boby Zavala as the top point earner with 221 points and Blue Panther Jr as the lowest with only 53 points in total. While Flyer scored low both in matches and with the judges the fan polls were strongly in his favor during the last four weeks that it moved him into fifth position. Blue Panther Jr., who was already the lowest ranked competitor, did not work his final match of the first round, with CMLL claiming force majeure, replacing him in the match with Hechicero who wrestled against Delta but did not get any points. His no-show did not change his rankings as he could not possibly have ended higher than seventh place. For the last week of the first round it looked as if Flyer would be in third place as long as he got decent points from the judges due to his strong poll numbers, but he was forced to pull out of the match due to a foot injury. Due to this CMLL had Guerrero Maya Jr. wrestle against Tritón. By not scoring any points from the judges at all Flyer felt to fourth position. In the end Guerrero Maya Jr., Bobby Zavala, Esfinge and Disturbio all qualified for the second round. Between rounds trainer Negro Casas will team up with Guerrero Maya Jr. and Boby Zavala to take on Virus, Esfinge and Disturbio as part of the July 24 Super Viernes show.

Round two
The second round of the tournament will run over three weeks, from July 31 through August 14 as Distrubio, Esfinge, Guerrero Maya Jr. and Boby Zavala will compete to qualify for the finals of the tournament.

Finals
The finals took place on August 21, 2015 and saw Boby Zavala pin Guerrero Maya Jr. to win the match and the tournament. As a result, Zavala gets to not only travel to Japan for the 2016 Fantastica Mania show as well as a title match of his choice in the future.

Notes

References

2015 in professional wrestling
CMLL En Busca de un Ídolo